"Twelfth Night" is a 1970 British TV adaptation of the play Twelfth Night by William Shakespeare. It was directed by John Sichel and broadcast as the 44th episode of second season of ITV Sunday Night Theatre. The score was composed by Marc Wilkinson.

Main cast
 Tommy Steele as Feste
 Ralph Richardson as Sir Toby Belch
 Alec Guinness as Malvolio
 Joan Plowright as Viola/Sebastian
 Gary Raymond as Orsino
 Adrienne Corri as Olivia
 John Moffatt as Sir Andrew Aguecheek
 Sheila Reid as Maria
 Riggs O'Hara as Fabian
 Richard Leech as Antonio
 Kurt Christian as Curio
 Christopher Timothy as Valentine

References

External links
 
 Twelfth Night at Letterbox DVD
 Twelfth Night at BFI Screenonline

1970 British television episodes
1970 television plays
British television plays
ITV Sunday Night Theatre
Television shows produced by Associated Television (ATV)